Jim Turner (born October 28, 1952) is an American actor and stand-up comedian. He is best known for his supporting roles as Kirby Carlisle in Arli$$ (1996–2002) and as Larry in Bewitched (2005).

Life and career
Turner was born in Colorado Springs, Colorado. His father, George Turner, was in the Air Force and moved his family around often during Jim's youth to several locations, including Quebec, Arizona, and Iowa. Turner married Lynn Freer in 1992 and they have a son, Otto. He is a longtime member of the comedy troupe Duck's Breath Mystery Theatre. He co-starred for seven seasons in HBO's comedy series Arliss as Kirby Carlisle, an ex-football-star-turned-agent and an old buddy of sports agent Arliss Michaels (Robert Wuhl).

Turner has appeared in 22 feature films and shorts, 28 TV series and appearances, 18 stage plays, one-man-shows, and comedy tours. He has created characters ranging from pinheads to Pinocchio. He has worked with Joel Schumacher, Robert Wuhl, Jack Black, Paul Bartel, and Tracey Ullman.

From 1987 to 1990, Turner performed on MTV and Ha! as Randee of the Redwoods, a character he adapted from his days with Duck's Breath Mystery Theatre. As part of a marketing stunt, Randee became the dark horse candidate for President.

Turner studied at the University of Iowa.

Turner is a founding member of the Los Angeles-based comedy group 2 Headed Dog with comedians Mark Fite, Dave (Gruber) Allen, and Craig Anton.

Turner has appeared multiple times as a guest on The George Lucas Talk Show, most notably with fellow cast members Robert Wuhl and Michael Boatman during the May the AR Be LI$$ You Arli$$ marathon fundraiser, as well as with Robert Wuhl on The George Lucas Holiday Special.

Film and television credits

Porklips Now (1980) 
Kid Colter (1984)
St. Elmo's Fire (1985)
The Lost Boys (1987)
Programmed to Kill (1987)
Destroyer (1988) 
My Samurai (1992)
12:01 (1993)  
Shelf Life (1993)
Rugrats (1993)
The Ref (1994) 
Coldblooded (1995) 
If Not for You (1995) 
364 Girls a Year (1996)
The Pompatus of Love (1996) 
Joe's Apartment (1996)
Arli$$ (1996–2002)
Kicking & Screaming (2005)
Bewitched (2005) 
Grunt: The Wrestling Movie 
On The Ropes
Cal (2013)
Granite Flats 
DLife

Guest appearances

Dharma & Greg (ABC)
That 70s Show (Fox)
Tracey Takes On... (HBO)
Sliders (Sci-Fi Channel)
Lost on Earth (USA Network)
Grace Under Fire (ABC)
The Larry Sanders Show (HBO)
Tom (ABC)
Roseanne (ABC)
The King of Queens (CBS)
Yes Dear (CBS)
Jonas (Disney Channel)
Boston Legal (ABC)
The Big Bang Theory (CBS)
Castle (ABC)
Grey's Anatomy (ABC)
Anger Management (FX)
The George Lucas Talk Show 
Righteous Gemstones(HBO)

References

External links

1952 births
Living people
American male film actors
American male television actors
American television writers
American male television writers
Male actors from Colorado Springs, Colorado
University of Iowa alumni
Screenwriters from Colorado